Heinrich Burkowitz (31 January 1892 – 31 May 1915) was a German sprinter. He competed at the 1912 Summer Olympics. He was killed in action in November 1918, while fighting in World War I.

See also
 List of Olympians killed in World War I

References

1892 births
1915 deaths
Athletes (track and field) at the 1912 Summer Olympics
German male sprinters
Olympic athletes of Germany
German military personnel killed in World War I
Athletes from Berlin
German Army personnel of World War I